Cerro Beltrán is an andesitic-dacitic volcano in the Andes. It erupted andesitic-dacitic lava flows between 14.1 and 7.7 mya. Part of the volcano was later covered by ignimbrites coming from the Galán caldera eruption.

The volcano is located next to the Salar de Antofalla. It is one of the large long-lived volcanoes forming the Archibarca-Galan volcanic alignment, along with Tebenquicho, Galán and Antofalla.

References 

Miocene stratovolcanoes
Extinct volcanoes
Volcanoes of Argentina
Stratovolcanoes of Argentina
Polygenetic volcanoes